Tara Morice (born 23 June 1964) is an Australian actress, singer and dancer.

Background 
Born in Hobart, Tasmania, Morice also lived in Sydney, Alice Springs and Adelaide as a child. She is a fifth-generation Australian and is of English, Irish, Scottish, Latvian, French and Jewish ancestry. She appeared in a short film for the Tasmanian Film Corporation in 1980, The ABC of Unions. She made her stage debut at Australia's oldest theatre, the Theatre Royal in Hobart in The Diary of Anne Frank, aged 16. She holds a Bachelor of Arts in Australian History and English from the Australian National University and graduated from the National Institute of Dramatic Art in 1987.

Career 
She has worked extensively on stage in Australia, including productions for the Sydney Theatre Company, Bell Shakespeare Company, Griffin Theatre Company, Belvoir Theatre Company, State Theatre of South Australia, Queensland Theatre Company, Malthouse and the Ensemble. She played Fran in Strictly Ballroom when it premiered as a stage play in 1988, and she was a member of Baz Luhrmann's Six Years Old Company. She was nominated for Best Supporting Actress in a Musical for her role in Fat Swan at the 2012 Helpmann Awards and a Victorian Green Room Award for The Venetian Twins in 1990.

Her first film appearance was as Fran in the 1992 film Strictly Ballroom (directed by Baz Luhrmann), for which she was nominated  for a BAFTA award for Best Actress in a Leading Role and an Australian Film Institute award. Morice also appeared on the film's soundtrack, singing a duet of Time After Time with Mark Williams.

Morice has also appeared in the feature films Metal Skin, Hotel Sorrento, Hildegarde, Moulin Rouge!, Candy, Razzle Dazzle: A Journey Into Dance, Oranges and Sunshine, Dance Academy: The Movie and Peter Rabbit 2: The Runaway. Her many short films include the Oscar nominated Miracle Fish.

Her television work includes roles in Answered by Fire, After the Deluge, Salem's Lot and McLeod's Daughters. Morice had a starring role in the series of three Dogwoman telemovies with Magda Szubanski in 2000. She also plays Miss Raine in Series 1, 2 and 3 of Dance Academy for ABC/ZDF.

She wrote and directed the documentary My Biggest Fan, about her correspondence and friendship with an American great-grandmother, Mildred Levine, who wrote to her after seeing Strictly Ballroom. The film premiered at the Fort Lauderdale International Film Festival, and was broadcast on the SBS network in Australia  in 2008.

Morice has a daughter, Ondine Morice Pearce, who was the stills photographer (at age 11) on My Biggest Fan.

She re-recorded Time After Time for Baz Luhrmann's album Something for Everybody and sang on the Strictly Ballroom, Razzle Dazzle : A Journey Into Dance and My Biggest Fan soundtracks.

Filmography

Film

Television

References

External links

1964 births
Living people
Actresses from Hobart
Australian film actresses
Australian television actresses
Australian National University alumni
National Institute of Dramatic Art alumni
Australian children's television presenters
Australian women television presenters